The men's long jump was a track & field athletics event at the 1900 Summer Olympics in Paris. It was held on July 14 and July 15, 1900. 12 athletes from six nations competed in the long jump. The event was won by Alvin Kraenzlein of the United States, the second consecutive victory for the American team. Myer Prinstein, also an American, took silver. Patrick Leahy, an Irish athlete competing for Great Britain, took bronze; it was the first long jump medal for a non-American athlete as the United States had swept the 1896 medals.

Background

This was the second appearance of the event, which is one of 12 athletics events to have been held at every Summer Olympics. None of the jumpers from 1896 returned. The top three jumpers in the world at the time were Americans Alvin Kraenzlein and Myer Prinstein and Irishman Peter O'Connor. All three were entered, but O'Connor did not appear.

Great Britain and Hungary each made their first appearance in the event. France, Germany, Sweden, and the United States all appeared for the second time.

Competition format

Unlike in 1896, where there was a single round of jumping, the 1900 competition featured two rounds: a qualifier and a final. The top five jumpers in the qualifier advanced to the final round. Scores from the qualifier carried over and could be used for the final result.

Records

These were the standing world and Olympic records (in metres) prior to the 1900 Summer Olympics.

(*) unofficial

Schedule

Results

All twelve jumpers competed in the qualifier, with the top five moving on to the final.

For the final, scores from the qualifier remained valid. Prinstein, citing an agreement between Kraenzlein and himself not to compete on a Sunday, did not compete in the final on 15 July. Kraenzlein, however, did compete and outperformed Prinstein's mark from the previous day. This infuriated Prinstein, who attempted to strike Kraenzlein. Sources vary as to whether any of the blows actually landed, however.

Delannoy did not improve upon his qualifier mark and dropped to fifth place.

References

Sources
 International Olympic Committee.
 De Wael, Herman. Herman's Full Olympians: "Athletics 1900". Accessed 18 March 2006.
 

Men's jumping long
Long jump at the Olympics